Thomas Gösweiner (born 3 March 1995) is an Austrian footballer currently playing as a forward for FC 08 Homburg of the German Regionalliga Südwest.

Career statistics

Club

Notes

References

1995 births
Living people
Austrian footballers
Austria youth international footballers
Association football forwards
FC Admira Wacker Mödling players
SK Sturm Graz players
Wormatia Worms players
TSG 1899 Hoffenheim II players
SV Elversberg players
FC 08 Homburg players
Austrian Football Bundesliga players
Austrian Regionalliga players
Regionalliga players
Austrian expatriate footballers
Austrian expatriate sportspeople in Germany
Expatriate footballers in Germany